Borneo Child Aid is an independent not-for-profit non-governmental organisation based in Sabah, Malaysia on the island of Borneo. The society operates more than 10 learning centres for over 2,000 children.

Thousands of children of mainly Indonesian and Philippine immigrant workers in remote areas of Sabah are still without access to school because of poverty, distance or legal status. The aims of Borneo Child Aid and its local partner PKPKM Sabah is to provide education by opening Learning Centres for these children, and thereby helping to fulfill the UN's millennium goals of basic education for all  children. This also will give an opportunity to study further and to participate in the society they live in.
The society is depending on support from socially responsible companies or individuals to be able to continue education for thousands of children. The project has been operated mainly on donations from corporations, individuals and substantial contributions from the Embassy of Finland, Bursa Malaysia, EAC Foundation, EcoOils, Yayasan Sime Darby, Knorr Bremse and others  .

Since start in 2012 the projects have had a good cooperation with UNICEF Malaysia as well as other organisations.

External links

References 

Educational organisations based in Malaysia